Jean-Paul Ngassa is a Cameroonian filmmaker. He made the films Adventure en France (1962) and La Grande Case Bamiléké (1965) after French Cameroun's independence in 1960. He co-directed the former with Philippe Brunet.

Notes

References
 DeLancey, Mark W., and Mark Dike DeLancey (2000): Historical Dictionary of the Republic of Cameroon (3rd ed.). Lanham, Maryland: The Scarecrow Press.
 West, Ben (2004). Cameroon: The Bradt Travel Guide. Guilford, Connecticut: The Globe Pequot Press Inc.

External links

Cameroonian film directors
Living people
Year of birth missing (living people)